Oedopa ascriptiva is a species of ulidiid or picture-winged fly in the genus Oedopa of the family Ulidiidae.

Distribution
United States.

References

Ulidiidae
Insects described in 1868
Taxa named by Hermann Loew
Diptera of North America